"Nothing Like Falling in Love" is a song written by Thom Schuyler and Jim Schnaars, and recorded by American country music artist Eddie Rabbitt.  It was released in November 1983 as the second single from his compilation album Greatest Hits Vol. II.  The song reached number 10 on the Billboard Hot Country Singles chart in February 1984 and number 1 on the RPM Country Tracks chart in Canada.

Chart performance

References

1983 singles
1983 songs
Eddie Rabbitt songs
Songs written by Thom Schuyler
Song recordings produced by Snuff Garrett
Song recordings produced by David Malloy
Warner Records singles